DJ Signify is an underground hip hop producer from Brooklyn, New York.

History
DJ Signify's first album Sleep No More, featuring collaborations with Sage Francis and Buck 65, was described as "hip-hop at its darkest and most chilling" and earned him accolades as a "master beatsmith." His second album Of Cities was similarly described as "dense, bleak instrumental hip-hop," reminiscent of Burial's Untrue and Tricky's Maxinquaye.

Discography

Albums
 Sleep No More (Lex Records, 2004)
 Of Cities (Bully Records, 2009)

Singles
 Untitled (2003) with Grandmaster Caz
 Winter’s Going (2004)
 Unclean Vol. 1 (2004)
 No One Leaves (2005) with Six Vicious
 Nobody's Smiling (2007) with Blockhead

Mixtapes
 Signifyin’ Breaks (1996)
 Mixed Messages (2000)
 Teach The Children Vol. 1 (2004)

Contributions
 Buck 65 - Square (2002)
 Clouddead - "And All You Can Do Is Laugh (2)" from Clouddead (2001)
 Sage Francis - "The Strange Famous Mullet Remover" "Smoke and Mirrors" from Personal Journals (2002)
 Sage Francis - "Kiddie Litter" from Sickly Business (2004)
 Blockhead - "Coloring Book" "Duke of Hazzard" "Put Down Your Dream Journal and Dance" "Trailer Love" from Uncle Tony's Coloring Book (2007)
 Isaiah Toothtaker - "Jumping Off" "Signifying" "R.I.P. Zeek" "What's Really Good?" from Murs 3:16 Presents (2008)
 Blockhead - "It's Raining Clouds" "Hell Camp" "Farewell Spaceman" from The Music Scene (2009)

Compilation appearances
 "Propaganda" "Meditations" "Interlude" with DJ Mayonnaise on Music for the Advancement of Hip Hop (1999)
 "I Dream (Tranquility)" with Lulu Mushi on Ropeladder 12 (2000)
 "Buk Out" "Motion Study" on Lunch Money Singles (2004)

References

American hip hop record producers
American hip hop DJs
Living people
Year of birth missing (living people)
Lex Records artists